Jeotgalicoccus halophilus is a species of bacteria. 

It is one of the phylum Bacillota; and it is categorized as a Gram-positive bacteria. 

The species is halotolerant and it grows at NaCl content of 0.1 to 16% - its optimal values for growth are between 2 and 3%. 

The cells are coccoid.

Etymology 
The genus name Jeotgalicoccus is derived from the Latin word "Jeotgalum" and refers to the locality of the first-described discovery, it was isolated from the Korean fish sauce Jeotgal. The species name refers to the halophile of the species.

References

External links
Type strain of Jeotgalicoccus halophilus at BacDive -  the Bacterial Diversity Metadatabase

halophilus
Bacteria described in 2011